Fionidae is a family of sea slugs, aeolid nudibranchs, marine gastropod molluscs in the superfamily Fionoidea.

Taxonomic history
This family was expanded to include Tergipedidae, Eubranchidae and Calmidae as a result of a molecular phylogenetics study. This was reversed in 2017 with further DNA evidence and a re-interpretation of genus and family characteristics.

Genera 
Genera within the family Fionidae include:
 Fiona Alder & Hancock [in Forbes & Hanley], 1853
 Calma Alder & Hancock, 1855
 Cuthona Alder & Hancock, 1855
 Cuthonella Bergh, 1884
 Eubranchus Forbes, 1838
 Murmania Martynov, 2006
 Tenellia A. Costa, 1866
 Tergipes Cuvier, 1805
 Tergiposacca Cella, Carmona, Ekimova, Chichvarkhin, Schepetov & Gosliner, 2016
 Rubramoena Cella, Carmona, Ekimova, Chichvarkhin, Schepetov & Gosliner, 2016
 Abronica Cella, Carmona, Ekimova, Chichvarkhin, Schepetov & Gosliner, 2016

References

External links 
 

 
Taxa named by John Edward Gray